The Williamson pink diamond is a flawless pink diamond discovered at the Williamson diamond mine in Tanganyika in 1947.  The owner of the mine, Canadian geologist John Williamson gave the uncut stone to Princess Elizabeth and Prince Philip upon their wedding in November 1947.

The  rough diamond was cut by London diamond cutters Briefel and Lemer in 1948, and Cartier was commissioned to create a setting for the main  round brilliant cut diamond.

The pink diamond became the main feature of a brooch designed by Frederick Mew of Cartier in 1952, forming the centre of a flower with five petals, with white diamonds forming the petals and white baguette cut diamonds as the stalk.

The Williamson pink diamond may be the inspiration for the Pink Panther diamond in the 1963 film The Pink Panther (although another alternative is the ancient Persian pink diamond, the Darya-ye Noor).

See also
 List of diamonds

References

Diamonds originating in Tanzania
Individual brooches
Pink diamonds
Individual diamonds
Wedding of Princess Elizabeth and Philip Mountbatten